Cardonald is a district of Glasgow.

Cardonald can also refer to:

Cardonald College
Cardonald railway station